Velika Loka is a village in the Municipality of Grosuplje in central Slovenia. It lies south of Višnja Gora in the historical region of Lower Carniola. The municipality is now included in the Central Slovenia Statistical Region.

Church

The local church is dedicated to Anthony of Padua and belongs to the Parish of Žalna. It was built between 1938 and 1940.

References

External links

Velika Loka on Geopedia

Populated places in the Municipality of Grosuplje